Fashing is an unincorporated community in Atascosa County, in the U.S. state of Texas. According to the Handbook of Texas, the community had a population of 35 in 2000. It is located within the San Antonio metropolitan area.

History
A  ranch named Hickok Ranch was subdivided into several farms in 1916. This area was first settled by ranching families along the San Patricio Trail as early as the 1850s. The Warnecke and Stieren Land Company promoted subdividing the ranch into farms, and O.F.C. Henke was the first person to purchase a small plot of land on the ranch. The community was first called Hickok, then Hindenburg, and then received the name Fashing for fashion brand tobacco and the German word Fasching (meaning “carnival” or “Shrovetide”). A post office was established at Fashing in 1920 and remained in operation until 1988. The first postmaster was Albert Schroeder. The community had a one-circuit phone list sometime before the 1920s. It did not have electricity until the Karnes Electric Cooperative was constructed in the 1930s. Most residents of the community are of German descent and brought with them their German traditions to Fashing. The local economy was dominated by oil, gas and uranium. It had five businesses and 25 residents in the 1930s, which grew to 125 residents and four businesses from 1939 to 1964. It did not have any more businesses in 1968 and the population went down to 90. It continued to go down to 50 from 1970 to 1990, then to 35 in 2000. Fashing was named the "Grand Champion Rural Community of Texas" for its efforts in improving the community in 1972. There were several Catholic, Methodist and Lutheran churches in Fashing over the years.

Fashing shares a community center with nearby Peggy.

Geography

Education
Fashing's first school opened in 1917 and was replaced by later school buildings in 1921 and 1952. There was a separate school built for Hispanic children in 1930 and was used until both schools were combined in 1947. The Fashing Common School District joined with the Karnes City Independent School District in 1958. Middle school students in grades 7th and 8th were bused to schools in Karnes City after 1980, while elementary-aged kids (1st-6th) stayed in Fashing until the school closed in 1988. The community continues to be served by Karnes City ISD today.

References

Unincorporated communities in Atascosa County, Texas
Unincorporated communities in Texas